Dodge Center Municipal Airport  is a public airport located one mile from the central business district of Dodge Center a city in Dodge County, Minnesota, United States. The airport is publicly owned by the city of Dodge Center.

References

Airports in Minnesota
Buildings and structures in Dodge County, Minnesota